Vokesimurex is a genus of sea snails, marine gastropod mollusks in the family Muricidae, the murex snails or rock snails.

Species
Species within the genus Vokesimurex include:
 Vokesimurex aliquantulus Houart & Héros, 2015
 Vokesimurex anniae (M. Smith, 1940)
 Vokesimurex bayeri Petuch, 2001
 Vokesimurex bellegladeensis (E. H. Vokes, 1963)
 Vokesimurex blakeanus (Vokes, 1967)
 Vokesimurex bobyini (Kosuge, 1983)
 Vokesimurex cabritii (Bernardi, 1859)
 Vokesimurex chrysostoma (Sowerby, 1834)
 Vokesimurex danilai (Houart, 1992)
 Vokesimurex dentifer (Watson, 1883)
 Vokesimurex dolichourus (Ponder & Vokes, 1988)
 Vokesimurex donmoorei (Bullis, 1964)
 Vokesimurex elenensis (Dall, 1909)
 Vokesimurex gallinago (Sowerby, 1903)
 Vokesimurex garciai (Petuch, 1987) 
 Vokesimurex hamanni (Myers & Hertz, 1994)
 Vokesimurex hirasei (Hirase, 1915)
 Vokesimurex kiiensis (Kira, 1959)
 Vokesimurex lividus (Carpenter, 1857)
 Vokesimurex malabaricus (E. A. Smith, 1894)
 Vokesimurex messorius (Sowerby, 1841)
 Vokesimurex mindanaoensis (Sowerby, 1841)
 Vokesimurex multiplicatus (Sowerby, 1895)
 Vokesimurex olssoni (Vokes, 1967)
 Vokesimurex purdyae (Radwin & D'Attilio, 1976)
 Vokesimurex rectaspira Houart & Héros, 2015
 Vokesimurex rectirostris (Sowerby, 1841)
 Vokesimurex recurvirostrum (Broderip, 1833)
 Vokesimurex rubidus (F. C. Baker, 1897)
 Vokesimurex ruthae (Vokes, 1988)
 Vokesimurex sallasi (Rehder & Abbott, 1951)
 Vokesimurex samui (Petuch, 1987)
 Vokesimurex sobrinus (A. Adams, 1863)
 Vokesimurex tricoronis (Berry, 1960)
 Vokesimurex tryoni (Hidalgo in Tryon, 1880)
 Vokesimurex woodringi (Clench & Pérez Farfante, 1945)
 Vokesimurex yuhsiuae Houart, 2014
Species brought into synonymy
 Vokesimurex bellus (Reeve, 1845): synonym of Vokesimurex chrysostoma (G. B. Sowerby II, 1834)
 Vokesimurex coriolis (Houart, 1990): synonym of Vokesimurex dentifer coriolis (Houart, 1990) represented as Vokesimurex dentifer (Watson, 1883)
 Vokesimurex lindajoycae (Petuch, 1987): synonym of Vokesimurex anniae (M. Smith, 1940)
 Vokesimurex morrisoni Petuch & Sargent, 2011: synonym of Vokesimurex bellegladeensis (E. H. Vokes, 1963)
 Vokesimurex tweedianus (Macpherson, 1962): synonym of Haustellum tweedianum (Macpherson, 1962)

References

 Houart R. (2014). Living Muricidae of the world. Muricinae. Murex, Promurex, Haustellum, Bolinus, Vokesimurex and Siratus. Harxheim: ConchBooks. 197 pp.

External links

 
Muricinae